UNIR may refer to:

Political parties 
 National Leftist Revolutionary Union, Colombia; defunct
 National Union for Independence and Revolution, Chad; defunct
 Revolutionary Left Union, Peru; defunct
 Union for Rebirth / Sankarist Party, Burkina Faso
 Union for the Republic (Togo)
 Union for the Republic – National Movement, Democratic Republic of the Congo
 UNIR Constitutional Nationalist Party, Argentina

Other uses 
 Federal University of Rondônia, in Brazil